Douglas Evans (born October 10, 1980) is an American mixed martial artist. He competes in the Featherweight division, and is best known for the first round of his fight against Thierry Quenneville, which was named Sherdog's 2009 Round of the Year. In July 2001, Evans was also part of the delegation of three American fighters invited to Myanmar for the first time to compete under Lethwei rules.

Career

Mixed martial arts career 
Evans became a 7-time Alaska State Freestyle and Greco-Roman champion in amateur wrestling competition.

Evans wrestled in high school for Bartlett High School in Anchorage.  As a freshman he won a region championship and placed 4th at the 4A State Championships. As a junior he was a region runner-up and again placed 4th at the state meet.  Evans wrestled future Bellator contender Jesse Brock in high school.

Evans made his professional MMA debut in February 1999. He quickly established an impressive 6-1 record while fighting in his native Alaska and one fight in California. This drew the attention of the Ultimate Fighting Championship and he was signed with the company in 2007.

Ultimate Fighting Championship 
Evans made his UFC debut in June 2007, fighting Roger Huerta at The Ultimate Fighter 5 Finale.  He lost the fight via TKO.

In his second UFC fight, Evans faced Mark Bocek at UFC 79.  He lost the fight via unanimous decision and was subsequently released from the promotion.

Lethwei 
In June 2001, Evans was matched against Lethwei World Champion Wan Chai at the "International Myanmar traditional boxing challenge & Myanmar-Australia talent testing boxing competition" in Yangon, Myanmar. In he first round, Evans was dropped to the floor with a knee strike to the lower abdomen while clinching and lost by referee stoppage (TKO). Evans later claimed he was kneed in the groin by Wan Chai, however the official did not see the strike and TKO remained.

Championships and accomplishments
Shark Fights
Shark Fights Featherweight Championship (One time)

Lethwei record 

|-  bgcolor="#FFBBBB"
| 2001-06-09 || Loss || align="left" | Wan Chai|| International Challenge Fights, Thuwunna NIS(1) || Yangon, Myanmar || TKO || 1 ||
|-
| colspan=9 | Legend:

Mixed martial arts record

|-
| Loss
| align=center| 13–11
| Alexandre Bezerra
| Submission (ankle lock)
| Bellator 57
| 
| align=center| 1
| align=center| 4:04
| Rama, Ontario, Canada
| 
|-
| Loss
| align=center| 13–10
| Antonio Carvalho
| Decision (unanimous)
| Score Fighting Series
| 
| align=center| 3
| align=center| 5:00
| Ontario, Canada
| 
|-
| Loss
| align=center| 13–9
| Alexander Sarnavskiy
| Submission (triangle choke)
| ProFC - Mayor's Cup 2011
| 
| align=center| 1
| align=center| 2:40
| Khabarovsk, Russia
| 
|-
| Win
| align=center| 13–8
| Maurice Mitchell
| Submission (rear-naked choke)
| Alaska Fighting Championship 79 - Champions
| 
| align=center| 1
| align=center| 1:32
| Anchorage, Alaska, United States
| 
|-
| Win
| align=center| 12–8
| Tristan Johnson
| Submission (rear-naked choke)
| W-1 New Ground
| 
| align=center| 3
| align=center| 1:55
| Nova Scotia, Canada
| 
|-
| Loss
| align=center| 11–8
| Ronnie Mann
| Decision (split)
| Shark Fights 13: Jardine vs Prangley
| 
| align=center| 5
| align=center| 5:00
| Amarillo, Texas, United States
| 
|-
| Win
| align=center| 11–7
| Dustin Phillips
| Submission (heel hook)
| Shark Fights 9: Phillips vs Evans
| 
| align=center| 1
| align=center| 2:25
| Amarillo, Texas, United States
| 
|-
| Loss
| align=center| 10–7
| Ian Loveland
| KO (head kick)
| Fitetime Entertainment - Arctic Combat
| 
| align=center| 5
| align=center| 0:09
| Fairbanks, Alaska, United States
| 
|-
| Win
| align=center| 10–6
| Jesse Kueber
| TKO (punches)
| AFC 66 - Alaska Fighting Championship
| 
| align=center| 1
| align=center| 2:08
| Anchorage, Alaska, United States
| 
|-
| Win
| align=center| 9–6
| Douglas Frey
| Submission (guillotine choke)
| Shark Fights 5.5: Nothing To Lose
| 
| align=center| 2
| align=center| 1:46
| Amarillo, Texas, United States
| 
|-
| Win
| align=center| 8–6
| Joel Nettles
| Submission (ankle lock)
| AFC 58 - Veterans Collide
| 
| align=center| 2
| align=center| 2:52
| Anchorage, Alaska, United States
| 
|-
| Loss
| align=center| 7–6
| Thierry Quenneville
| Submission (armbar)
| XMMA 7 - Inferno
| 
| align=center| 2
| align=center| 1:48
| Quebec, Canada
| 
|-
| Win
| align=center| 7–5
| Jared Lopez
| Submission (armbar)
| Shark Fights 1
| 
| align=center| 1
| align=center| 1:09
| Amarillo, Texas, United States
| 
|-
| Loss
| align=center| 6–5
| Kajan Johnson
| Submission (rear-naked choke)
| Raw Combat - Resurrection
| 
| align=center| 2
| align=center| 0:57
| Alberta, Canada
| 
|-
| Loss
| align=center| 6–4
| Bao Quach
| TKO (punches)
| ShoXC: Elite Challenger Series
| 
| align=center| 1
| align=center| 0:55
| Friant, California, United States
| 
|-
| Loss
| align=center| 6–3
| Mark Bocek
| Decision (unanimous)
| UFC 79
| 
| align=center| 3
| align=center| 5:00
| Las Vegas, Nevada, United States
| 
|-
| Loss
| align=center| 6–2
| Roger Huerta
| TKO (punches)
| The Ultimate Fighter 5 Finale
| 
| align=center| 2
| align=center| 3:30
| Las Vegas, Nevada, United States
| 
|-
| Win
| align=center| 6–1
| Mike Joy
| Decision (unanimous)
| AFC 35 - Alaska Fighting Championship
| 
| align=center| 3
| align=center| 5:00
| Anchorage, Alaska, United States
| 
|-
| Win
| align=center| 5–1
| Gary D'Hue
| TKO (punches)
| AFC 33 - Alaska Fighting Championship
| 
| align=center| 2
| align=center| 2:46
| Anchorage, Alaska, United States
| 
|-
| Win
| align=center| 4–1
| Jimmy Miller
| Decision (unanimous)
| PFC - Peninsula Fight Challenge 8
| 
| align=center| 3
| align=center| 3:00
| Soldotna, Alaska, United States
| 
|-
| Win
| align=center| 3–1
| Josh Branham
| Submission (strikes)
| AFC 30 - Alaska Fighting Championship
| 
| align=center| 1
| align=center| 2:10
| Anchorage, Alaska, United States
| 
|-
| Win
| align=center| 2–1
| Jesse Brock
| Decision (unanimous)
| AFC 25 - Alaska Fighting Championship
| 
| align=center| 3
| align=center| 5:00
| Anchorage, Alaska, United States
| 
|-
| Win
| align=center| 1–1
| Gary McElwain
| Submission (rear-naked choke)
| AFC 23 - Alaska Fighting Championship
| 
| align=center| 1
| align=center| 1:55
| Anchorage, Alaska, United States
| 
|-
| Loss
| align=center| 0–1
| Tiki Ghosn
| Submission (guillotine choke)
| West Coast NHB Championships 2
| 
| align=center| 1
| align=center| N/A
| Compton, California, United States
|

References

External links
 
 

1980 births
American male mixed martial artists
Featherweight mixed martial artists
Lightweight mixed martial artists
Mixed martial artists utilizing Lethwei
Mixed martial artists utilizing freestyle wrestling
Mixed martial artists utilizing Greco-Roman wrestling
American Lethwei practitioners
American male sport wrestlers
Living people
Mixed martial artists from Alaska
Sportspeople from Anchorage, Alaska
Ultimate Fighting Championship male fighters